Baie-Sainte-Catherine, Quebec is a town in Quebec, Canada. The municipal's territory extends along the Saguenay and Saint Lawrence rivers, whereas the town itself is on the small St. Catherine Bay, which is located at the confluence of these two rivers. Its elevation is 260 feet.

It is the west terminus of the Baie-Ste-Catherine / Tadoussac ferry, which offers free and frequent service across the Saguenay River to Tadoussac.  The ferry is part of Quebec Route 138 which is the main land link to Sept-Îles along the Côte-Nord.

Baie-Sainte-Catherine is a gateway to the Saguenay–St. Lawrence Marine Park and to the Saguenay Conservation Park. Therefore it caters to tourism, particularly to whale-watching cruises on the Saint Lawrence and Saguenay Rivers.

History
Baie-Sainte-Catherine has the reputation of being the location of the historic meeting on May 27, 1603, between François Gravé Du Pont and Samuel de Champlain and the leaders of three Indian nations with whom they concluded an agreement that opened the Saint Lawrence River to French explorers.

On the stormy evening of November 27, 1686, the ship La Catherine went aground and sank in the bay at the mouth of the Saguenay River. On the 1731 map by Laure, this bay was identified as "Ance à la Catherine" (archaic French for "Catherine Cove"). At some uncertain point in time, "Saint" was added, following the former widespread practice in Quebec of sanctifying toponyms.

Around 1820, the first permanent settlers came to the Canard River area and formed a farming village. In 1843, William Price built a sawmill at the first falls on Canards River, that operated some ten years. In 1847, the mission was founded, and named "Saint-Firmin" by the bishop of Quebec. Its first cemetery opened in 1865 on Alouettes Point, followed by the first chapel of St. Firmin Mission in 1876, also on Alouettes Point. At the beginning of the 20th century, it transformed into an industrial village when another sawmill and cheese factory operated there.

In 1903, the village was incorporated as the Municipality of Saint-Firmin. But since the place was called Baie-Sainte-Catherine in common use, the municipality officially adopted this name in 1984.

Demographics

Population

Private dwellings occupied by usual residents: 97 (total dwellings: 125)

Language
Mother tongue:
 English as first language: 0%
 French as first language: 97.3%
 English and French as first language: 0%
 Other as first language: 0%

See also
 1925 Charlevoix–Kamouraska earthquake
List of municipalities in Quebec
Société des traversiers du Québec

References

External links

Municipalities in Quebec
Incorporated places in Capitale-Nationale